This is a list of Grand Army of the Republic (G.A.R.) posts in Kansas, United States.

The G.A.R., Department of Kansas was established December 7, 1866. It was preceded by an organization known as the Veteran Brotherhood (and Union Brotherhood), State of Kansas organized in December 1865. The Department of Kansas was permanently reorganized on March 16, 1880 after several years of disorganization. The first statewide encampment was held in Topeka in 1882. The last state encampment was held in Emporia in 1943.

Over 28,000 Civil War veterans lived in Kansas after 1865; the overwhelming number of these men were Union veterans. At its peak in the late 1880s, the G.A.R. in Kansas had over 19,000 members in 478 posts.

Kansas G.A.R. Posts

Abbreviations used
 MG = Major General
 BG = Brigadier General
 Col = Colonel
 Ltc = Lieutenant Colonel
 Maj = Major
 Cpt = Captain
 Lt = 1st Lieutenant
 2Lt = 2nd Lieutenant
 Sgt = Sergeant
 Cpl = Corporal
 Pvt = Private

See also

 National Register of Historic Places listings in Kansas
 List of National Historic Landmarks in Kansas

Footnotes

External links 
  — Collection description for Grand Army of the Republic, Department of Kansas Records, Manuscript Collection no. 126, Kansas State Historical Society, Topeka, Kansas.
  — Searchable necrology of over 13,000 Kansas G.A.R. members, maintained by the Kansas State Historical Society.
  — Searchable database of over 28,000 Civil War veterans who lived in Kansas after 1865, maintained by the Kansas State Historical Society.

Landmarks in Kansas
Clubhouses in Kansas
Grand Army of the Republic Posts
Grand Army of the Republic